Percy Edmund Williams (1910-1996) was an Australian rugby league player who played in the 1930s and 1940s.

Playing career
A Souths junior, Williams became a long serving and valuable member of the South Sydney club in the 1930s. He played seven seasons with South Sydney between 1931-1938 and also captained the club during the mid 1930s.

Williams was a dual premiership winner with Souths, playing halfback in the 1931 and 1932 Grand Final teams.

Williams represented New South Wales on 15 occasions between 1932-1938 and was selected on the 1937-38 Kangaroo Tour, playing in two tests against England and two tests against New Zealand. He finished his career at Newtown, playing two seasons (1940-1941) and was Captain-Coach in 1941. Later, he coached St George Dragons in 1945 and Eastern Suburbs in 1948.

Death
Williams died on 10 July 1996, 43 days short of his 86th birthday.

References

1910 births
1996 deaths
Australia national rugby league team players
City New South Wales rugby league team players
Country New South Wales rugby league team players
New South Wales rugby league team players
Newtown Jets coaches
Newtown Jets players
Rugby league five-eighths
Rugby league halfbacks
Rugby league players from Sydney
South Sydney Rabbitohs players
St. George Dragons coaches
South Sydney Rabbitohs captains